The 1938 European Women Basketball Championship was the 1st regional championship held by FIBA Europe for women. The competition was held in Rome, Italy and took place from October 12 to October 16, 1938. Italy won the gold medal and Lithuania the silver medal while Poland won the bronze.

Squads

Results

Final standings

External links
 FIBA Archive

 
1938 in women's basketball
1938 in Italian women's sport
International women's basketball competitions hosted by Italy
October 1938 sports events
Basketball in Rome
1930s in Rome
Sports competitions in Rome